David Robert Mitchell (born October 19, 1974) is an American film director and writer. He received significant recognition as a director after completing his second feature, the critically acclaimed horror film It Follows (2014).

Early life and education
Mitchell was born in Clawson, Michigan. He graduated from Florida State University College of Motion Picture Arts with a Master of Fine Arts degree in production.

Career
Mitchell's first full-length film was the coming-of-age drama The Myth of the American Sleepover (2010). Adele Romanski, a friend of Mitchell's from film school, served as one of the producers. In an interview, Mitchell said that the film cost about $50,000.

Four years later, he directed the supernatural horror film It Follows. The film was acclaimed by critics and was a remarkable commercial success considering its low, independent film budget.

Mitchell served as a jury member in the International Critics' Week section of the 2016 Cannes Film Festival.

In 2018, he directed Under the Silver Lake, a postmodern noir comedy-drama film set in Los Angeles and starring Andrew Garfield.

Filmography

References

External links 
 
 David Mitchell at the 21. international literature festival berlin

1974 births
American film editors
American male screenwriters
Film directors from Michigan
Living people
People from Clawson, Michigan
Screenwriters from Michigan